Volodymyr Ivanovych Yezerskiy (born 15 November 1976) is a former professional Ukrainian football defender. He also played for the Ukraine national team in 1998–2008. Yezerskiy is a Distinguished Master of Sports (2005).

Career

Club
Yezerskiy started his professional football career in 1997 in Karpaty Lviv. Two years later, he was picked up by Ukrainian giants, Dynamo Kyiv, and, later, by Kryvbas Kryvyi Rih. In 2000, Yezerskiy left to Dnipro Dnipropetrovsk, where he became an integral part of the team. On 20 June 2007 he was signed by FC Shakhtar Donetsk on a 3-year deal with a transfer fee of €1.2 million from Dnipro Dnipropetrovsk. He was loaned out to Zorya Luhansk during the winter break of the 2009–10 Premier league season.

National
Yezerskiy played his first international game for the Ukraine national team on 15 July 1998 against the Poland national football team. However, after his successes in Dnipro, he became a regular player of the national team squad. He helped Ukraine qualify for their first World cup in 2006. Ukraine managed to get to the quarterfinals, losing to eventual world champions Italy.

International goals
Both of his goals were scored from a corner kick and were game openers.

Honours

Club
Shakhtar Donetsk
 Ukrainian Premier League: 2000, 2008, 2010
 Ukrainian Cup: 2008
 Ukrainian Super Cup: 2008
 UEFA Cup: 2009

Individual
 Ukrainian Bravery Order III Degree: 2006

References

External links
 Profile on Official Shakhtar website
 Profile on Official FFU website 
Profile on ukrsoccerhistory.com
 

1976 births
Living people
Ukrainian footballers
2006 FIFA World Cup players
Ukraine international footballers
Sportspeople from Lviv
FC Haray Zhovkva players
FC Dynamo Kyiv players
FC Dynamo-2 Kyiv players
FC Dynamo-3 Kyiv players
FC Dnipro players
FC Dnipro-2 Dnipropetrovsk players
FC Dnipro-3 Dnipropetrovsk players
FC Karpaty Lviv players
FC Karpaty-2 Lviv players
FC Kryvbas Kryvyi Rih players
FC Shakhtar Donetsk players
FC Zorya Luhansk players
SC Tavriya Simferopol players
Ukrainian Premier League players
Association football defenders
Ukrainian football managers